"The Witch's Promise" is a single by the British rock band Jethro Tull, released in January 1970, on the Chrysalis label. It reached No. 4 in the UK Singles Chart, and was promoted by an appearance on the British chart show Top of the Pops. The B-side was "Teacher", an alternate version of which later appeared on the US release of the album Benefit. In the U.S., the single was released on the Reprise label.

Background
The song was recorded at Morgan Studios, London, on 19 December 1969. It was intended to be a follow-up to the group's two previous singles, "Living in the Past" and "Sweet Dream", which had been top ten hits. Musically, it developed from the style heard on the group's previous album, Stand Up, discarding the blues influences that the band had started with, and steered towards folk.

The single was the first recording to feature keyboardist John Evan, who would be an important member of Jethro Tull throughout the 1970s. He was sharing a flat with frontman Ian Anderson at the time, and agreed to perform as a session musician. He played Hammond organ on "Teacher" and both piano and mellotron on "The Witch's Promise." This led to an offer to join the band full-time. The track is one of the few recorded by Jethro Tull to feature the Mellotron, a tape replay keyboard that could emulate a string section, and the only single released by the band to feature the instrument.

"The Witch's Promise" was intended to be the last standalone single from the group, that was not taken from an LP. Anderson said the group would issue singles from future albums in order to gain radio play, but he was not particularly interested in promoting them.

The song appeared in a remix version on both the UK and US version of the compilation album Living in the Past (1972).

Personnel
 Ian Anderson – vocals, flute
 Martin Barre – guitar
 Glenn Cornick – bass
 Clive Bunker – drums

Additional personnel
 John Evan – piano, Mellotron

Covers
English rock band All About Eve covered the song on a 10" vinyl release of their 1989 single "December".

References
Citations

Sources

External links
 Lyrics at genius.com

Jethro Tull (band) songs
1970 singles
1970 songs
Songs written by Ian Anderson
Chrysalis Records singles
Song recordings produced by Ian Anderson